The European School, Karlsruhe, commonly known as ESK, is one of three European Schools in Germany and one of thirteen across the European Union (EU).  Founded in 1962, the school prioritises, for enrolment purposes, the children of staff of the European Commission's Joint Research Centre for Nuclear Safety and Security based nearby. Children of non-EU staff may enrol provided there is capacity. ESK is an all-through school catering for nursery, primary and secondary pupils, culminating in the awarding of the European Baccalaureate as its secondary leaving qualification.

Notable people

Alumni 

 Sarah Teichmann (1981-1993), bioinformatician

Former staff 
 Tom Høyem, school Director (2000-2015)

See also 
European School
European Schools

References

External links 
 

Educational institutions established in 1962
Karlsruhe
Schools in Baden-Württemberg
Education in Karlsruhe
1962 establishments in West Germany